Rishra Municipality is the civic body that governs Rishra and its surrounding areas in Srirampore subdivision of Hooghly district, West Bengal, India.

History
Rishra municipality was established in 1944.

The earliest mention of Rishra is found in Bipradas Pipilai’s Manasa Mangal Kavya in the fifteenth century. Rishra grew as a place of habitation of cotton and silk weavers, farmers and fishermen. Rishra and Konnagar were initially included in Serampore Municipality.

Geography
Rishra Municipality covers an area of 6.48 sq km and has a total population of 122,000 (2011).

In 1981, 31.93% of the total population formed main workers and 68.07% were non-workers in Rishra Municipality and 75.22% of the total main workers were industrial workers. This may be interpreted as follows: although industrial activities are prominent in the municipal areas of the region, the major portion of the population is commuters and migrants find employment in the area.

Healthcare
Rishra Municipal Seva Sadan (closed), with 150 beds, is located in the Rishra Municipality area.

Elections
In the 2015 municipal elections for Rishra Municipality Trinamool Congress won 19 seats, CPI 1 seat,  Congress 1 seat and Independents 2 seats.

In the 2010 municipal elections for Rishra Municipality Trinamool Congress won 9 seats, Congress won 8 seats, CPI (M) 4 seats, CPI 1 seat and Independent 1 seat.

About the 2010 municipal elections, The Guardian wrote, "Today's municipal elections are unlike any for decades: the Communists, who have held West Bengal's main towns almost without a break since the 1970s, are facing disaster… This time defeat is likely to be definitive and could signal the beginning of the end for the Communist Party of India-Marxist (CPIM)."

In the 2005 municipal elections for Rishra Municipality, CPI (M) won 5 seats, CPI 3 seats,  Congress 8 seats, Trinamool Congress 1 seat and others 6 seats.

References

 

Municipalities of West Bengal